La Piscine (The Swimming Pool) is a 1969 psychological thriller film directed by Jacques Deray, starring Alain Delon, Romy Schneider, Maurice Ronet, and Jane Birkin.

Set in summertime on the Côte d'Azur, it is a drama of sexual jealousy and possessiveness. Both French and English-language versions of the film were made, with the actors filmed speaking English for the international release, which was unusual at a time when movies were always either dubbed or subtitled. The 114-minute international release, shorter than the French version, also had a slightly different editing.

Plot 
Jean-Paul, a writer, and Marianne, his girlfriend of just over two years, are holidaying at a friend's villa near Saint-Tropez. There is a tension in their relationship which excites Marianne: the film begins with a scene in which they are together beside the villa's swimming pool and she urges him to scratch her back. He does as she asks, but then throws her into the pool and jumps in after her. In a later scene he takes a branch and uses it to lash her bare buttocks, playfully but with a force that increases as the scene cuts away.

Harry, an old friend and record producer who was Marianne's lover before Jean-Paul, arrives for a visit, surprising the couple by bringing along his 18-year-old daughter Penelope, whose existence they had not previously known about. Marianne, without asking Jean-Paul, invites Harry and Penelope to stay.

The four stay together and Harry draws Marianne back towards him as the days go by. Taunting Jean-Paul for having given up serious writing to work in advertising, Harry drinks a great deal and throws a surprise party while Jean-Paul, a recovering alcoholic, stays sober. Meanwhile, it becomes clear that Penelope neither likes nor respects her father, whom she has barely known while growing up. She and Jean-Paul become close and spend a day alone together by the sea.

That night, while the women are asleep, Harry drunkenly confronts Jean-Paul and accuses him of seducing Penelope to revenge his own shortcomings on his more successful friend. Trying to punch Jean-Paul, Harry falls into the pool and is too drunk to swim. Jean-Paul, who has also been drinking, at first stops him from climbing out of the water, then deliberately pushes Harry under and holds him down until he drowns. He covers up the crime by stripping Harry's clothes off and placing fresh trousers and a shirt at the poolside to make it look like an accident.

After the funeral, a policeman, Inspector Lévêque, visits the house more than once. He confides to Marianne his reasons for doubting the story of an accident: that Harry had been wearing his watch, which was expensive and not waterproof, and that there is no trace of sweat on the clothes he was supposed to have been wearing. When she tells Jean-Paul, he confesses everything to her, and she goes to see Harry's clothes, hidden in the cellar, that would have given him away. But when she does not take this evidence to the police, the inspector reluctantly suspends the inquiry.

Marianne takes Penelope to the airport and sees her off as she returns to her mother. When Penelope demands the truth about her father's death, Marianne assures her it really was an accident. She and Jean-Paul are then about to leave the villa when she tells him that they will not go together. She calls for a taxi but he places his hand on the telephone, cutting off her call and silencing her. In the end, neither leaves that day, and in the film's final shot they stand side by side looking out the window at the swimming pool, and then embrace.

Cast
Romy Schneider as Marianne
Alain Delon as Jean-Paul Leroy
Maurice Ronet as Harry Lannier
Jane Birkin as Penelope Lannier
 Paul Crauchet as Inspector Lévêque

Production
The filming began August 19 and finished October 19, 1968. French designer André Courrèges created many custom pieces for the film, such as the swimsuits worn by Schneider and Birkin. It was the first of the nine films Delon and director Jacques Deray made together, and the only one the star didn't produce. It also marked the onscreen reunion of Delon and Romy Schneider, his co-star in Christine (1958) as well as his off-stage romantic partner between 1958 and 1963.

It was during the making of this film that the Markovic Affair broke out. The body of Stevan Markovic, Delon's bodyguard, was discovered in a public dump in the village of Élancourt, Yvelines, on October 1, 1968.

Reception
It was the fourth most popular movie at the French box office in 1969.

The movie was released in the UK as The Sinners to limited box office response. It was released in Italy with twenty minutes cut out, but was a popular success.

The Los Angeles Times called it a "handsome, stunningly designed film" which was at its best in "the deft way in which it coolly depicts how beautiful, chic people, dedicated to a sophisticate, amoral view of love, can be utterly defenseless against an onslaught of passion – a favorite Gallic theme." The Guardian wrote: "Erotic languour turns gradually into fear and then horror in this gripping and superbly controlled psychological thriller" where "something in the very lineaments of the pool itself creates their own awful destiny: it is a primordial swamp of desire, a space in which there is nothing to do but laze around, furtively looking at semi-naked bodies."

La Piscine was restored and re-released in theaters during the summer of 2021, becoming a surprise hit. Scheduled to run at the Film Forum in New York for two weeks, it ended up running for 18 weeks, causing Glynnis MacNicol of the New York Times to declare: "If there is a film of New York’s 2021 summer, this may be it." However, the film was "dismissed as gossip-column fodder in its time". Writing for The New Yorker, critic Richard Brody was less than enthusiastic about the film's 2021 revival. "I paid it little attention," Brody noted, "in the hope that, given its dry and flimsy mediocrity, it would just blow away into the oblivion whence it emerged." He went on to declare the film a "faux-hip empty shell of faux modernity."

The review aggregator Rotten Tomatoes reported that 95% of critics have given the film a positive review based on 19 reviews, with an average rating of 7.40/10.

Remake
The 2016 film A Bigger Splash, directed by Luca Guadagnino and starring Ralph Fiennes, Tilda Swinton, Matthias Schoenaerts, and Dakota Johnson, is loosely based on La Piscine.

Trivia
An excerpt of the film was used in the Christian Dior Eau Sauvage cologne advertising campaign drawing on the legacy of Alain Delon.

Alain Delon said in an interview that he cannot watch this film again. His ex-lover Romy Schneider and good friend Maurice Ronet both died prematurely and under tragic circumstances. Revisiting the scenes is simply too painful for him.

References

External links 
 
 La Piscine at Variety Distribution
La piscine: Savage Water an essay by Jessica Kiang at the Criterion Collection
The Movie World's Misplaced Worship of "The Swimming Pool"|The New Yorker

1969 films
1969 crime drama films
1960s psychological thriller films
French crime drama films
Italian crime drama films
1960s French-language films
Films about writers
Films based on French novels
Films set on the French Riviera
Films shot in Saint-Tropez
Films directed by Jacques Deray
Films with screenplays by Jean-Claude Carrière
1960s Italian films
1960s French films